Antonio Vita (born 16 December 1921, date of death unknown) was a Peruvian sports shooter. He competed at the 1956, 1960, 1964 and 1968 Summer Olympics.

References

External links
 

1921 births
Year of death missing
Peruvian male sport shooters
Olympic shooters of Peru
Shooters at the 1956 Summer Olympics
Shooters at the 1960 Summer Olympics
Shooters at the 1964 Summer Olympics
Shooters at the 1968 Summer Olympics
People from Talara